The Peleng tarsier (Tarsius pelengensis), or the Peleng Island tarsier, is a nocturnal primate found on the island of Peleng, just east of Sulawesi, Indonesia.

Description
Tarsiers are small, agile primates, adapted for climbing, leaping and foraging at night. They have long fingers and toes with gripping pads, large eyes, large ears and greyish fur.

Distribution and habitat
The Peleng tarsier is endemic to the island of Peleng, off the east coast of Sulawesi, and it may also be present on other smaller islands of the Banggai Archipelago. The natural habitat of this tarsier is primary forest; however, illegal logging and forest clearance has reduced the primary forest of the island to about 9% of its original extent. Little is known about the habitat requirement for this species, but other tarsier species have been found in secondary forest, or other non-primary habitat, so it seems likely that the Peleng tarsier can occupy similar habitat. Secondary forest occupies about 63% of the island, making 72% of the surface area potentially providing suitable habitat.

Ecology
Tarsiers are social and tend to live in family groups with a home range. They are carnivorous, feeding on insects, spiders and other small arthropods as well as small vertebrates. During the day they sleep in concealed locations in tangled vegetation a few metres off the ground, emerging at dusk to forage during the night.

Like other tarsiers, this species can turn its head through almost 180 degrees in each direction, much like an owl. Breeding pairs communicate by making characteristic duetting calls. Due to the great similarity of these calls to those of Dian's tarsier (Tarsius dentatus), the two species are thought to be closely related. Studies of the calls of tarsiers on Sulawesi and the surrounding islands enable cryptic species to be distinguished from one another, and indicate that there may be four as yet undescribed species.

References

Peleng tarsier
Endemic fauna of Indonesia
Mammals of Sulawesi
Primates of Indonesia
Endangered fauna of Asia
Peleng tarsier